Jack Reekie (12 March 1871 – 5 September 1963) was an Australian rules footballer who played with Carlton in the Victorian Football League (VFL).

References

External links 

Jack Reekie's profile at Blueseum

1871 births
1962 deaths
Australian rules footballers from Melbourne
Carlton Football Club (VFA) players
Carlton Football Club players